The  (Italian; Volta Temple in English) is a museum in the city of Como, Italy that is dedicated to Alessandro Volta, a prolific scientist and the inventor of the electrical battery. Volta was born in Como in 1745, held his first professorship there until 1779, and retired to Como in 1819.

The neoclassical building was designed by Federico Frigerio (1873–1959). It was completed in 1927 to celebrate the 100th anniversary of the scientist's death, but was inaugurated in 1928. It hosts a collection of scientific instruments used by the physicist including his early voltaic piles (batteries). The first floor has a display of his personal belongings and his awards.

In 1984 the museum was featured on the back of the 10,000 lire banknote. Volta's portrait was depicted on the front of the same banknote. The notes circulated until 2001, when the Euro notes replaced them. Banknotes based on the Italian lira have since been replaced by notes denominated in Euros.

Near the Tempio Voltiano are the new statue by Daniel Libeskind named Life Electric and the Faro Voltiano.  both dedicated to Volta.

References

Further reading

Neoclassical architecture in Lombardy
Buildings and structures in Como
Infrastructure completed in 1927
Voltiano
Biographical museums in Italy
Science museums in Italy
Alessandro Volta